Shorea parvistipulata, locally known as kawang daun merah, is a species of tree in the family Dipterocarpaceae. It is endemic to Borneo, where it is widespread in lowland and hill rain forests.

Description
Shorea parvistipulata is a large emergent tree, which can grow up to 70 meters high.

Range and habitat
Shorea parvistipulata is widespread on the island, present in Sabah and Sarawak states of Malaysia, Kalimantan (Indonesian Borneo), and Brunei. It grows in lowland mixed dipterocarp forest and lower montane mixed dipterocarp forest, up to 1,300 meters elevation.

Subspecies
Three subspecies are recognized:
 Shorea parvistipulata subsp. albifolia P.S.Ashton – present across the island except in Sabah
 Shorea parvistipulata subsp. nebulosa (Meijer) P.S.Ashton – endemic to Sabah
 Shorea parvistipulata subsp. parvistipulata – the most widespread subspecies, present across the island

References

parvistipulata
Endemic flora of Borneo
Trees of Borneo
Plants described in 1891
Flora of the Borneo lowland rain forests
Flora of the Borneo montane rain forests